Gerardo Alberto Bedoya Múnera (born 26 November 1975) is a retired Colombian footballer. He began as a defender but he also played as a defensive midfielder.

Nicknamed "the beast," he currently holds the record for most red cards (46) received by any player in the history of the game.

Club career 

Bedoya started his professional career with Deportivo Pereira in 1996. He joined Deportivo Cali in 1998 where he was part of the squad that won the league title in 1998.

In 2001, Bedoya moved to Argentina where he played for Racing Club de Avellaneda, helping the club to win the Apertura 2001 tournament. In 2004, he joined Colón de Santa Fe and in 2005 he moved to Boca Juniors where he only played 3 games (all in the Copa Libertadores) before moving to Mexico to play for Puebla F.C.

In 2005 Bedoya returned to Colombia to play for Atlético Nacional and in 2006 he joined Millonarios. After he went for a brief time to Envigado F.C. But then joined Boyacá Chicó F.C. for the 2010 season.

In 2011, Bedoya signed a one-year contract with Independiente Santa Fe.

Bedoya has the ignominy of being the professional footballer with the most red cards to his name (46 red cards). In the Bogota derby between Independiente Santa Fe and Millonarios on 23 September 2012, he received his 41st red card in a professional game, being sent off for the elbow and subsequent kick to the head aimed at Millonarios player Jhonny Ramirez. The offense also got him suspended for the next 15 matches. Bedoya has been sent off multiple times since.

International career 

Bedoya made his debut for the Colombia national team in the 2000 Gold Cup match against Jamaica on 12 February 2000. He scored the equalizing goal in the quarter final penalty shootout victory against the USA on 19 February, where he also earned a red card in the last minute of extra time. Bedoya was also part of the Colombia squad that won the Copa América 2001, where he played five matches and scored a goal in the semi-finals victory against Honduras.

He played all five matches at the 2003 Confederations Cup, where Colombia finished in fourth place. Bedoya was a starting player in the 2006 FIFA World Cup qualifiers, but was not called up for the 2007 Copa América. His last match for the national team was on 1 April 2009, a 2–0 loss against Venezuela.

Coaching career
Following his retirement from his club career, Bedoya went into coaching. In his first position as assistant manager with Santa Fe in 2016, he was dismissed from the dugout after 21 minutes of a league fixture against Junior.

International goals 
Colombia score listed first, score column indicates score after each Bedoya goal.

List of career red cards

Club career

International career

Coaching Career

Honours

Club 
Deportivo Cali
 Categoría Primera A (1): 1998
Racing Club de Avellaneda
 Argentine Primera División (1): 2001-2002 Apertura
Independiente Santa Fe
 Categoría Primera A (1): 2012 Apertura

International 
 Copa América (1): 2001

Individual 
 Most football red cards received by a player (41)

References

External links 

 
 Argentine Primera statistics at Fútbol XXI  
 

1975 births
Living people
Colombian footballers
Colombia international footballers
2000 CONCACAF Gold Cup players
2001 Copa América players
2003 FIFA Confederations Cup players
Deportivo Pereira footballers
Deportivo Cali footballers
Racing Club de Avellaneda footballers
Club Atlético Colón footballers
Club Puebla players
Boca Juniors footballers
Atlético Nacional footballers
Millonarios F.C. players
Envigado F.C. players
Boyacá Chicó F.C. footballers
Independiente Santa Fe footballers
Fortaleza C.E.I.F. footballers
Cúcuta Deportivo footballers
Categoría Primera A players
Argentine Primera División players
Colombian expatriate footballers
Expatriate footballers in Argentina
Expatriate footballers in Mexico
Copa América-winning players
Association football midfielders
Sportspeople from Antioquia Department